Tomasz Maciej Budzyński (born  2 October 1962) is Polish musician, painter and poet, the lead vocalist of the band Armia.

He has worked with bands 2Tm2,3, Budzy i Trupia Czaszka, he was also first vocalist of punk rock band Siekiera.

Discography

With Armia

With Budzy i Trupia Czaszka
2004 - Uwagi Józefa Baki

As Tomasz Budzyński
2002 - Taniec Szkieletów
2008 - Luna
2011 - Osobliwości

Guest appearance
 Izrael Duchowa Rewolucja
 Acid Drinkers The State of Mind Report

References 

1962 births
Living people
People from Tarnobrzeg
Polish poets
Recipients of the Bronze Medal for Merit to Culture – Gloria Artis
21st-century Polish male singers
21st-century Polish singers